Blue Gap (Navajo: Tachíí/Bis Dootłʼizh Ndeeshgiizh) is an unincorporated community in Apache County, Arizona, United States. The community is in Polacca Wash near State Road 291 in western Apache County. Blue Gap has a post office with ZIP code 86520.

References

Unincorporated communities in Apache County, Arizona
Unincorporated communities in Arizona
Navajo Nation